This is a list of musicians from African countries

Algeria 
See: List of Algerian musicians

Angola 
See: List of Angolan musicians

Benin 
 Angelique Kidjo
 Wally Badarou

Botswana 
 Banjo Mosele
 Franco and Afro Musica
 Katlego Kai Kolanyane-Kesupile
 Matsieng
 Joe Morris
 Zeus

Burkina Faso 
 Balaké
 Cheikh Lô
 Dramane Kone
 Farafina

Burundi 
 Khadja Nin
 Kebby Boy
 Sat-B
 Miss Erica

Cameroon 

See: List of Cameroonian musicians

Cape Verde 
 Cesaria Evora
 Gil Semedo

Côte d'Ivoire 
 Alpha Blondy
 Magic System
 Ernesto Djédjé
 Tiken Jah Fakoly
 DJ Arafat
 Serge Beynaud

Republic of the Congo (Congo-Brazzaville)
 Youlou Mabiala
 Pierre Moutouari
 Werrason
 Papa Wemba
 Ferre Gola
 Fally Ipupa
 Mbilia Bel
 Abeti Masikini
 Madilu System
 Youlou Mabiala
 Franco Luambo Makiadi
 Franklin Boukaka
 Koffi Olomide

Democratic Republic of the Congo (former Zaire) 
See: List of Democratic Republic of the Congo musicians

Egypt 
See: List of Egyptian musicians

Eritrea 
 Abraham Afewerki

Ethiopia

Gabon 
 Oliver N'Goma
 Patience Dabany
 Annie-Flore Batchiellilys

Gambia 
 Sona Maya Jobarteh
 Foday Musa Suso

Ghana

Guinea 
 Sona Tata Condé
 Sekouba Bambino
 Daddi Cool
 Les Ballets Africains
 Balla et ses Balladins
 Bembeya Jazz
 Djeli Moussa Diawara
 Famoudou Konaté
 Mory Kanté
 Mamady Keita
 Ballet Nimba
 Mista Shaw

Guinea-Bissau 
 José Carlos Schwarz
 Eneida Marta

Kenya

Liberia

Madagascar
See: List of Malagasy musicians

Mali 
 Boubacar Traoré
 Mory Kanté
 Salif Keita
 Toumani Diabaté
 Kandia Kouyaté
 Habib Koité
 Issa Bagayogo
 Rokia Traoré
 Tinariwen
 Ali Farka Touré
 Amadou et Mariam
 Oumou Sangaré
 Afel Bocoum
 Lobi Traoré
 Fatoumata Diawara
 Djelimady Tounkara
 Rail Band

Mauritania 
 Dimi Mint Abba
 Malouma
 Noura Mint Seymali

Morocco

Mozambique 
 Wazimbo
 Ghorwane
 Fany Pfumo
 Stewart Sukuma
 Moreira Chonguica
 Lizha James
 Neyma
 Mingas
 Al Bowlly
 Wazimbo
 340ml
 Afric Simone

Namibia 
 Jericho

Niger 
 Mamar Kassey
 Mdou Moctar

Nigeria 
See list of Nigerian musicians

 Rwanda 
 Alpha Rwirangira
 Tom Close
 Knolwess Butera
 Benjami Mugisha
 Urban Boyz
 Kate Bashabe
 Simon Bikindi
 Corneille (singer)
 Miss Jojo

 Senegal 
 Akon
 Baaba Maal
 Étoile de Dakar
 Ismaël Lô
 Mansour Seck
 Orchestra Baobab
 Positive Black Soul
 Thione Seck and Raam Daan
 Star Band
 Touré Kunda
 Youssou N'Dour and Étoile de Dakar
 Xalam (band)

 Sierra Leone 
 Bai Kamara
 S. E. Rogie
 Steady Bongo
 K-Man
 Emmerson
 Anis Halloway
 Supa Laj

 Somalia 
 Xiddigaha Geeska
 Mohamed Mooge Liibaan
 Abdullahi Qarshe
 Waayaha Cusub
 Ali Feiruz
 Hasan Adan Samatar
 Aar Maanta
 Mohamed Sulayman Tubeec
 Maryam Mursal
 K'naan
 Guduuda 'Arwo
 Magool

 South Africa See: List of South African musicians

 South Sudan 
 Yaba Angelosi
 Mary Boyoi           
 Emmanuel Jal
 Silver X

 Sudan 
 Abdel Aziz El Mubarak
 Abdel Gadir Salim
 AlKabli
 Emmanuel Jal
 Mohammed Wardi

Swaziland
 Dusty & Stones
 Tendaness

 Tanzania 
 Ali Kiba
 Bill Nass
 Joseph Lusungu
 Mnenge Ramadhani
 Muhiddin Maalim
 Hassani Bitchuka
 Saidi Mabera
 Wilson Kinyonga
 Remmy Ongala
 Kasaloo Kyanga
 Mr. Nice
 Saida Karoli
 Diamond Platnumz
 Lady Jaydee
 Professor Jay
 TID
 Rose Mhando
 Vanessa Mdee
 A.Y.
 Ruby
 Rayvanny
 Bi Kidude
 Carola Kinasha
 Imani Sanga
 Tudd Thomas

 Togo 
 Bella Bellow
 King Mensah

 Tunisia 
 Dhafer Youssef

 Uganda See: List of Ugandan musicians

 Zambia See: List of Zambian musicians

 Zimbabwe See:'' List of Zimbabwean musicians

See also

 List of Soukous musicians
 List of African guitarists

References

African music
Lists of musicians by nationality
Musicians